Miklós Kollár (born 18 February 1979) is a Hungarian swimmer. He competed in the men's 200 metre freestyle event at the 1996 Summer Olympics.

References

1979 births
Living people
Hungarian male swimmers
Olympic swimmers of Hungary
Swimmers at the 1996 Summer Olympics
Swimmers from Budapest
20th-century Hungarian people
21st-century Hungarian people